Andrew Dickson (born 1945 in Isleworth, London) is an English music composer, who won a European Composer Award for his work on the 1988 film High Hopes. He has composed for TV dramas and has also worked in theatre as an actor, director, musical director, musician and composer.

List of movies he has composed for (8 titles):
 Meantime (TV Movie) – 1983
 High Hopes – 1988
 Naked – 1993
 Oublie-moi – 1994
 Someone Else's America – 1995
 Secrets & Lies – 1996
 All or Nothing – 2002
 Vera Drake – 2004

List of movies he has acted in (2 titles):
 Facelift – 1984 as pit orchestra
 Dutch Girls (TV Movie) – 1985 as guitarist

List of movies he was in music department (1 title):
 Meantime (TV Movie) – 1983 – musician

References

External links

 https://www.last.fm/music/Andrew+Dickson

1945 births
Living people
English composers
European Film Award for Best Composer winners